Dalia may refer to:

People
 Dalia (given name), a given name and listing of people with the name 
 Dalia (Egyptian singer), of album Bahebak enta 1998
 Badrunnesa Dalia, Bengali singer known as Dalia

Places
 Dalia (oil field), an offshore oil field in Angola
 Dalia, Israel, a kibbutz
 Dalia, the Latinized name for Dalsland, Sweden

Other uses
 Dalia (mythology), a Lithuanian goddess
 Dalia, a South Asian broken wheat and mung lentil porridge

See also
 Dhalia (1925–1991), Indonesian actress
 Dahlia (disambiguation)